South Calgary is a residential neighbourhood in the southwest quadrant of Calgary, Alberta. It is located between 14th St west and Crowchild Trail. The community has an area redevelopment plan in place.

The community maintains an outdoor swimming pool, as well as a community hall and several city parks. The Giuffre Family Library (previously Alexander Calhoun Library) of the Calgary Public Library is also located in the area.

South Calgary was established in 1914 on land annexed by the City of Calgary in 1907. However, the area remained largely undeveloped until the early 1950s.

Demographics 

Residents in South Calgary had a median household income of $38,012 in 2000, and 28.2% low-income residents live in the neighbourhood. 61.1% of the properties were used for renting in 2001.

Government 
South Calgary is represented in the Calgary City Council by Ward 8 councillor Courtney Walcott, on a provincial level by Calgary Currie MLA Nicholas Milliken and Calgary-Elbow MLA Doug Schweitzer, and at the federal level the riding of Calgary Centre represented by Greg McLean.

See also 
List of neighbourhoods in Calgary

References

External links 
South Calgary Community Association

Neighbourhoods in Calgary
1914 establishments in Alberta